Mohamad Maso  (born 23 July 1993) is a Syrian triathlete. He competed in the men's event at the 2020 Summer Olympics. During the opening ceremony, he was reunited with his brother, Alaa, who represented the IOC Refugee Olympic Team.

References

External links
 

1993 births
Living people
Syrian male triathletes
Olympic triathletes of Syria
Triathletes at the 2020 Summer Olympics
Sportspeople from Aleppo
Triathletes at the 2018 Asian Games
20th-century Syrian people
21st-century Syrian people